The men's team sprint at the 2012 UCI Track Cycling World Championships was held on 4 April. 17 nations of 3 cyclists each participated in the contest. After the qualifying, the fastest two teams raced for gold, and 3rd and 4th teams raced for bronze.

Medalists

Results

Qualifying
The qualifying was held at 19:35.

Finals 
The finals were held at 21:10.

Small final

Final

References

2012 UCI Track Cycling World Championships
UCI Track Cycling World Championships – Men's team sprint